Rancid is the eponymously titled debut extended play by the American punk rock band Rancid. It was released in January 1992 through Lookout! Records, home of Tim Armstrong and Matt Freeman's prior band, Operation Ivy. It is a recording of the band in its earliest days as a three-piece. Although the correct title of the extended play is simply Rancid, it is commonly referred to as I'm Not the Only One or The Bottle (because of the cover) among Rancid collectors and fans.

Only released on seven-inch vinyl, the songs from the extended play have never been re-recorded for future albums. As of June 2008, it is out of print and has not been domestically released on CD, however, its contents appear as bonus tracks on the Japanese release of B Sides and C Sides.

A common bootleg recording from these sessions exists entitled Demos from the Pit. It contains nearly twenty more songs, half of which are unreleased, the others are different versions of songs from its debut studio album, Rancid. Many feature completely different lyrics, and music.

Track listing

Personnel
 Tim Armstrong - lead vocals, guitar
 Matt Freeman - bass, vocals
 Brett Reed - drums, backing vocals
 Andy Ernst - producer
 Jimmy Johnson - executive producer
 Martin Sprouse - graphics

References

External links

1992 debut EPs
Rancid (band) albums
Lookout! Records EPs